= Muhammad Anwar-ul-Haq =

Pakistani politician

Muhammad Anwar-ul-Haq is a Pakistani politician who served as a member of the Provincial Assembly of Punjab for three consecutive terms: 1990–1993, 1993–1996, and 1997–1999. He has also served as Minister for Social Welfare.

Anwar-ul-Haq was born on July 15, 1960, in Rawalpindi to Muhammad Zia-ul-Haq the longest serving dictator of Pakistan. He earned his MBBS degree in 1985.
